The  was a field army of the Imperial Japanese Army during World War II.

History
The Japanese 18th Army was formed on November 9, 1942, under the Japanese Eighth Area Army of the Southern Expeditionary Army Group for the specific task of opposing landings by Allied forces in Japanese-occupied New Guinea. Upon establishment, it was made up of three divisions:  the 20th, which had been raised from men from Kyushu, and the 41st and 51st Divisions formed from the Kantō region.

New Guinea campaign

Both the 20th and 41st Divisions arrived in New Guinea safely. However, the 51st Division, including the army's commander, Hatazō Adachi, and his senior staff, came under Allied air attack while en route from their supply base at Rabaul to Lae, in the Battle of the Bismarck Sea. All eight transport ships and four destroyers were sunk with the loss of 3,664 men, and only 2,427 men of the division were rescued.

Operation Cartwheel, an Allied master plan implemented from mid-1943, progressively severed the supply lines between Rabaul and frontline Japanese forces. Key defeats included the withdrawal of the Imperial Japanese Navy from the Solomon Islands campaign, followed by landings on New Britain, as well as Aitape and Hollandia, in April 1944.

Adachi's forces were badly affected by tropical diseases including malaria, heat exhaustion and malnutrition for the remainder of the war, despite Adachi's efforts to achieve some form of self-sufficiency by planting crops and giving priority in rations to the sick. As ammunition began to run low, many of Japanese field commanders resorted to banzai charges, rather than surrender.

By the end of the war in September 1945, most of his forces had been annihilated. Of Adachi's original 140,000 men, barely 13,000 were still alive when the war ended. The remnants of the Japanese 18th Army surrendered to the Australian 6th Division at  Cape Wom, by Wewak, New Guinea. They were held on Mushu Island before being returned to Japan.

List of Commanders

Notes

References

Books

Journals

18
Military units and formations established in 1942
Military units and formations disestablished in 1945
J